Sealand Rifle Range Halt railway station served RAF Sealand in Sealand, Flintshire, Wales, from 1923 to 1954 on the	Borderlands line.

History 
The station was opened in June 1923 by the London and North Eastern Railway. It was situated to the east of the RAF base. It had no other amenities besides platforms. Nothing was timetabled to stop there originally but it was shown in a 1947 timetable, showing that it was for military use only. The station closed on 14 June 1954. Nothing survived by the 1960s.

References

External links 

Disused railway stations in Flintshire
Former London and North Eastern Railway stations
Railway stations in Great Britain opened in 1923
Railway stations in Great Britain closed in 1954
1923 establishments in Wales
1954 disestablishments in Wales